Helga Schauerte-Maubouet (born 8 Mars, 1957, Lennestadt) is a German-French organist, writer and editor of music. Schauerte has recorded the complete organ works of Jehan Alain, Dietrich Buxtehude, and J. S. Bach (in process), portraits of Buttstett, Corrette, Reger, Boëllmann, Dubois and Langlais, comprising some thirty recordings). She works as a performing artist in Europe and throughout the USA, and is Organist of the German Lutheran Church in Paris, and teaches at the Paris Conservatory Nadia et Lili Boulanger. She is also lecturer and jury member for international organ competitions.

Her career has been influenced by German and French music. In 2006 she founded a Bach-organ-academy in Pontaumur (Auvergne, France). She wrote the first book in German on Jehan Alain’s music, and has acquired some forty of this composer’s musical autographs. She has been engaged by Bärenreiter to contribute to the new edition of MGG, to write on French organ music subjects in the Handbuch Orgelmusik, and to publish scholarly-critical editions of the complete organ works of Léon Boëllmann, Théodore Dubois, Louis Vierne and Jehan Alain as well as of vocal music of Marc-Antoine Charpentier. She has also composed French Noël and German carol-settings for other instruments and organ published by Merseburger-Verlag.

Schauerte made her first public appearance at the age of 10. At 13 she became organist in Lennestadt. A disciple of Viktor Lukas and Marie-Claire Alain she culminated her studies respectively in Cologne, with degrees in music, pedagogy and philosophy, and in Paris, with the Premier Prix. Jean Langlais entrusted her with the first performance of several of his works, of which Miniature II is dedicated to her. In 1987 she received the cultural prize of Olpe, Germany. Since 1990 her biography has been included in the International Who’s Who in Music, and she has been selected to figure in 2000 Outstanding Musicians of the 20th Century.

She was awarded the Order of Merit of the Federal Republic of Germany and the French Cultural Minister awarded her the distinction of Chevalier in the Order of Arts and Letters.

Discography
Complete Organ Works
 Jehan Alain : 2 volumes (Motette, 11311 /11301) 1990,
 Dietrich Buxtehude : 5 volumes, Syrius (SYR 141.347/348/359/366/371), 2000-2002,
 Johann Sebastian Bach : (under way) (Syrius, 12 volumes published in 2018),
Portraits
 Die Passauer Domorgel : Les plus grandes orgues d'église du monde St. Stephen's Cathedral, Passau (Syrius,141310) 1995,
 Max Reger : œuvre d'orgue pour le temps de Noël (Syrius,141320) 1997,
 Johann Heinrich Buttstett (Syrius,141334) 1998,
 Jean Langlais (Ambiente, ACD 9801) 1998,
 Léon Boëllmann (Syrius, 141374) 2003,
 Théodore Dubois (Syrius, 141382) 2004,
 Louis-Nicolas Clérambault, Nicolas Séjan, Jean-François Dandrieu, at the organ of Saint-Calais (Sarthe) (Syrius, 141396) 2005,
 Michel Corrette, André Raison, Jacques-Marie Beauvarlet-Charpentier, Louis Marchand, Orgue historique de La Flèche (Sarthe) (Syrius, 141408) 2006,
 Johann Sebastian Bach and his time. Historical Organs in the district of Olpe,
 Organum Antiquum: Earliest Organ Music until Johann Sebastian Bach (Syrius, 141459) 2012,

Critical editions

Complete Organ Works Bärenreiter
 2002 - 2004 Léon Boëllmann, 4 Volumes (BA 8424/8425/8462/8463/8464/8465)
 2005 - 2007 Théodore Dubois, 6 Volumes (BA 8468 to BA 8471, BA 9208/9209)
 2008 - 2013 Louis Vierne, 10 Volumes (BA 9221 to BA 9238) 
 2011 Jehan Alain, 3 Volumes (BA 8428 to BA 8430)

Piano Bärenreiter
 2008 Louis Vierne, Complete Piano Works, Vol III (BA 9613)

Choir and Orchestra Bärenreiter
 2004 Marc-Antoine Charpentier, Te Deum H.146, 5th edition in 2018 (BA 7593)
 2004 Marc-Antoine Charpentier, Messe de Minuit H.9 (BA 7592)
 2005 Marc-Antoine Charpentier, Te Deum H.148(BA 7591)
 2020 Gabriel Fauré, Œuvres complètes, Série I, vol. 4: Musique vocale religieuse pour voix, orgue et instruments (BA 9478-01)

 Publications 
 Jehan Alain, Mourir à trente ans, Delatour France, Sampzon 2020, translated into English by Carolyn Shuster Fournier and Connie Glessner: Jehan Alain, Understanding His Musical Genius'', Delatour France, Sampzon, 2022

External links 

 (fr) Helga Schauerte Website
 (en) Her life - Photos and Publications,
 (fr) Eglise évangélique allemande,
 (fr) 
 (en) Conversation avec Helga Schauerte-Maubouet

1957 births
Living people
French classical organists
Women organists
German classical organists
French people of German descent
People from Lennestadt
Chevaliers of the Ordre des Arts et des Lettres
Recipients of the Cross of the Order of Merit of the Federal Republic of Germany
21st-century organists
21st-century French women musicians